Esten Graham Cromartie (June 17, 1892 – February 4, 1963) was an American college football coach and agriculture instructor. He served as the first head coach in the history of the football program at Georgia Southern University–then known as Georgia Normal School–from 1919 to 1926, compiling a record of 29–39–4. Cromartie was also an instructor in agriculture at the school.

Head coaching record

References

External links
 

1892 births
1963 deaths
Georgia Southern Eagles football coaches
People from Statesboro, Georgia